The Pennsylvania Railroad's class HH1s comprised a single 2-8-8-2 type steam locomotive. Unlike most Pennsylvania Railroad steam locomotives, it had a wagon-top boiler. It was built by the American Locomotive Company (ALCO) in 1911. For 17 years, the single HH1s served as a helper until 1928. It had the road number 3396 and was subsequently scrapped after it was taken out of service in 1928.

References 

Steam locomotives of the United States
HH1s
ALCO locomotives
Scrapped locomotives
Unique locomotives
Standard gauge locomotives of the United States
2-8-8-2 locomotives
Railway locomotives introduced in 1911